Meshkan (also romanized as Meshkān and Moshkān; also known as Mishkūn and Moshgān) is a city and capital of Poshtkuh District, in Neyriz County, Fars Province, Iran.  At the 2006 census, its population was 4,630, in 1,196 families.

References

Populated places in Neyriz County

Cities in Fars Province